Volodar Arturovich Murzin (born 18 July 2006) is a Russian chess player. He is a grandmaster (GM).

Originally from Nizhny Tagil, Murzin lives in Khimki.

Career
Murzin won the U12 title at the European Youth Chess Championship 2018, with a draw against Jakub Chyzy in the final round.

In the Chess World Cup 2021, where he was seeded 151st, he reached the second round shortly before his 15th birthday, losing to 23rd-seeded Vladislav Artemiev by one point in a tiebreaker. He later competed in the 2021 Julius Baer Challengers Chess Tour, placing 4th.

References

External links
 Volodar Murzin at Chess.com
 Ratings for Volodar Murzin at Chess Federation of Russia

Living people
2006 births
Chess grandmasters
Russian chess players